The Papua New Guinea Independence Medal was created in 1975 to commemorate the transition from self-government to the full independence of Papua New Guinea. It is a part of the Papua New Guinea honours system.

Criteria
The Government of Papua New Guinea awarded the Papua New Guinea Independence Medal to members of the Papua New Guinea Defence Force, who had served between 1 December 1973 and 16 September 1975. Civilian recipients were honoured for outstanding service during the same period of time. Military personnel and civilians from Commonwealth realms such as Australia and the New Zealand were also awarded the medal.

Precedence

Notable recipients
 Bill Bradfield
 Kevin Byrne
 Yash Ghai
 Michael Jeffery
 Jim Molan
 Michael Somare
 Marilyn Strathern
 John Lavett

References

External links
 Independence Medal

Independence Medal